The Hyeopdo (Modern South Korean pronunciation: /çʌp.do/) was a polearm used in Korea. It was also called micheomdo, which could be translated as "eyebrow sword" because the curved blade resembled an eyebrow. The first written reference to a hyeopdo is in a Korean martial arts manual from the 17th century called the Muyeyebobeon Yeoksokjip (무예예보번역속집).

Design
The blade is single-edged. It closely resembles the woldo ("moon blade") and the Chinese podao.

Use
The hyeopdo was considered an important weapon because of its effectiveness. It was much easier to handle than the bigger and heavier woldo. In the Muyedobotongji, another martial arts manual, one form for use is given, called hyeopdo chongbo (협도총보, 挾刀總譜).

See also
Glaive
Guandao
Naginata
Muyejebo
Muyedobotongji

References

Traditional Korean weapons
Korean swords
Polearms